West Virginia Wildcats may refer to:

 West Virginia Wildcats, former name of Herd That, a basketball team that competes in The Basketball Tournament
 West Virginia Wildcatz, a team of the semi-professional American Basketball Association
 West Virginia WildKats, a team of the Women's Spring Football League
 Wildcat, West Virginia, an unincorporated community in Lewis County

See also
 Wheeling Wildcats, a defunct professional indoor football team located in Wheeling, West Virginia
 Wildcat (disambiguation)